Parkumäki is a Finnish village that was the site of the Battle of Parkumäki and its memorial. It is located in the Rantasalmi municipality in Southern Savonia

Rantasalmi
Villages in Finland